Raparna is a genus of moths of the family Erebidae.

Description
Palpi with second joint reaching vertex of head and thickly scaled. Third joint long and naked. Antennae minutely ciliated in male. Thorax and abdomen smoothly scaled. Tibia nearly naked. Forewings with rectangular or rounded apex. The areole sometimes very small if present, or usually absent. Hindwings with vein 5 from well above lower angle of cell. Vein 3 and 4 from cell or on a very short stalk.

Taxonomy
The genus has previously been classified in the subfamily Phytometrinae of Erebidae or the subfamily Calpinae of the family Noctuidae.

Species
 Raparna bipuncta Warren & Rothschild, 1905
 Raparna confusa Mabille, 1900
 Raparna conicephala Staudinger, 1870
 Raparna crocophara Turner, 1922
 Raparna didyma Mabille, 1900
 Raparna limbata Butler, 1898
 Raparna minima Warren & Rothschild, 1905
 Raparna ochreipennis Moore, 1882
 Raparna tritonias Hampson, 1902

Former species
 Zargata melanospila is now Janseodes melanospila (Guenée, 1852)

References

 
 Staudinger (1870). Berliner Entomologische Zeitschrift 14: 121.

Boletobiinae
Noctuoidea genera